Viktor Ivanovich Khokhryakov   (1913–1986) was a Soviet Russian film actor, theater actor and director. He played the composer Alexander Glazunov in the 1954 film Rimsky-Korsakov.

People's Artist of the USSR (1973). Winner of two Stalin Prizes (1949, 1951).

Biography
Victor Khokhryakov was born on July 13 (26), 1913 in Ufa.

Work in the theater began in the auxiliary structure of the Bashkir Academic Drama Theater Mazhit Gafuri (1926).

In 1933 he graduated from the Leningrad College of Performing Arts.

Selected filmography
 In the Name of Life (1946)
 Michurin (1948)
 The Young Guard (1948)
 The Miners of Donetsk (1951)
 Rimsky-Korsakov (1954)
 Seven Nannies (1962)
 Earthly Love (1974)
 Destiny (1977)

References

Bibliography 
 Mitchell, Charles P.  The Great Composers Portrayed on Film, 1913 Through 2002. McFarland / Company, 2004.

External links 
 

1923 births
1986 deaths
Russian male film actors
People from Ufa
20th-century Russian male actors
Soviet male film actors
Soviet male stage actors
Soviet theatre directors
Spoken word artists
People's Artists of the USSR
People's Artists of the RSFSR
Honored Artists of the RSFSR
Stalin Prize winners
Communist Party of the Soviet Union members
Burials at Vagankovo Cemetery